Ingested is an English death metal band from Manchester, formed in 2006. The band consists of vocalist Jason Evans, guitarist Sean Hynes and drummer Lyn Jeffs. The band has released six studio albums since formation, with the lastest being Ashes Lie Still in 2022 via Metal Blade Records.

History

Formation and early years (2006–2012)
The band was formed in the British city of Manchester in 2006, the group consisted of lead vocalist Jason Evans, drummer Lyn Jeffs, guitarists Sean Hynes and Sam Yates and bassist Brad Fuller, who are all original members. Hynes and Jeffs formerly played in British deathcore act Annotations of an Autopsy.

After signing to Candlelight Records and Siege of Amida Records, Ingested released their debut album called Surpassing the Boundaries of Human Suffering in June 2009.

In 2010, Ingested toured throughout Europe for the first time as part of the Bonecrusher Fest which was headlined by The Black Dahlia Murder and supported by Carnifex, 3 Inches of Blood and the Faceless. Tours alongside acts like Annotations of an Autopsy and Martyr Defiled as well as festival appearances at Ghostfest and Extremefest followed.

In 2011, Ingested released their second record The Surreption via Siege of Amida.

The Architect of Extinction and The Level Above Human (2013–2018)
An EP followed in 2013 called Revered by No One, Feared by All. After signing to Century Media, the band released their third full-length album The Architect of Extinction in 2015.

The first USA tour Ingested ever did was in the Autumn of 2015 on the Devastation on the Nation tour. As they were supporting other extreme metal bands like Origin, Krisiun, Aeon, Alterbeast and Soreption. In 2016 Ingested toured North America for the second time, being part of the annual Summer Slaughter Tour.

In 2016, Ingested signed to Unique Leader Records which will release their fourth LP The Level Above Human in April 2018.

It was announced that Ingested will return to North America including their first appearance in Mexico in mid of 2018 followed by another European tour in support of their fourth record The Level Above Human. In support for The Level Above Human, the band did their first full USA headliner in the Spring of 2018 with Signs of the Swarm and Bodysnatcher. They also played on the 2018 Devastation on the Nation tour with bands like Aborted, Psycroptic, Disentomb, Venom Prison, Vale of Pnath and Arkaik. Jason Evans, the current vocalist of Ingested could not tour due to personal reasons; his fill in was Jason Keyser of the technical death metal band Origin.

Ingested returned to Europe in the September 2018, opening up for Sludge Metal band Crowbar. Ingested also did their second headliner in the United States known as the "Evisceratour" in late 2018. Enterprise Earth, I Declare War, Bodysnatcher, Aether and I AM joined up as support.

Where Only Gods May Tread  and Ashes Lie Still (2019–present)
In 2019, Ingested supported Cryptopsy on their Spring European tour. Incite, Demonical, Nightrage and Gloryhole Guillotine joined up on the lineup as well. In April and May 2019, Ingested supported The Black Dahlia Murder on their European and UK tour. Ingested opened for Despised Icon on their fall 2019 tour in the United States. Kublai Khan and Shadow of Intent joined up as support. Ingested toured Europe in November 2019 on their "Decade Of Human Suffering" Tour performing Surpassing The Boundaries of Human Suffering in its entirety. Within Destruction, Signs of the Swarm and Distant accompanied them on this tour.

The band's fifth studio album, Where Only Gods May Tread, was released on 14 August 2020. Metal Hammer named it as the 44th best metal album of 2020.

On 30 July 2021, Ingested released The Surreption II, a fully re-recorded version of their second album.

On 3 August 2022, the band released a new single titled "Shadows in Time", and also revealed their sixth studio album, Ashes Lie Still, will be released on 4 November.

Members 
Current lineup
 Jason Evans - lead vocals (2006–present)
 Sean Hynes - guitars, backing vocals (2006–present)
 Lyn Jeffs - drums (2006–present)
 Dom Grimard - bass (studio only) (2019–present)

Past members
 Brad Fuller - bass (2006–2019)
 Sam Yates - guitars, backing vocals (2006–2021); bass (2019–2021)

Discography

Studio albums 
 Surpassing the Boundaries of Human Suffering (2009), Candlelight Records, Siege of Amida Records; reissued by Unique Leader Records (2019) 
 The Surreption (2011), Siege of Amida Records; re-recorded and re-released as The Surreption II (2021) by Unique Leader Records
 The Architect of Extinction (2015), Century Media
 The Level Above Human (2018), Unique Leader Records
 Where Only Gods May Tread (2020), Unique Leader Records
 Ashes Lie Still (2022), Metal Blade Records

EPs 
Stinking Cesspool of Human Remnants (2007), self-released
 Revered by No One, Feared by All (2013), Siege of Amida Records
 Call of the Void (2019), Unique Leader Records
 Stinking Cesspool of Liquefied Human Remnants (2021), Unique Leader Records

Split albums 
 North-West Slam Fest (Split with Crepitation and Kastrated) (2007), Grindethic Records

References

External links 
 
 Artist profile at Century Media
 Artist profile at Unique Leader Records

2002 establishments in England
British musical trios
English death metal musical groups
English deathcore musical groups
Musical groups established in 2002
Musical groups from Manchester